Renata AG SA (Renata Batteries), based in Itingen, Switzerland, is a developer and manufacturer of batteries (particularly coin or button cells). Renata is a subsidiary of The Swatch Group.

Technology 

Battery technologies offered by Renata comprise silver oxide (for wristwatches, calculators and small electronic toys, etc.), zinc air (for hearing aids), lithium (non-rechargeable, primary) (for computer battery backup, etc.) and battery holders, as well as lithium polymer (rechargeable, secondary) (for industrial use).

History 

Renata was founded in 1952 by Kurt Zehntner, as a manufacturer of components for mechanical watches and diversified into production of coin or button cells in 1974. Renata was acquired by SMH Swiss Corporation for Microelectronics and Watchmaking Industries Ltd in 1982 (in 1998 SMH became known as The Swatch Group) and produces cells, batteries and associated encapsulation technologies and cell/battery holders.

Global Position 

Renata claims to be "one of the three largest producers of coin cells worldwide" and also claims that it produces over one million batteries a day.

References

External links 
 Renata corporate website
 Swatch Group corporate website

Battery manufacturers
Swiss companies established in 1952
Manufacturing companies of Switzerland
Manufacturing companies established in 1952